Septimus Eric "Sep" Rutherford (29 November 1907 – 1975) was an English footballer.

Career
Rutherford played in the Football League for Blackburn Rovers and Portsmouth. His brothers Bob and Jock were also professional footballers as well as his nephew John.

References

1907 births
1975 deaths
English footballers
Blackburn Rovers F.C. players
Portsmouth F.C. players
English Football League players
Association football wingers
People from Percy Main
Footballers from Tyne and Wear
FA Cup Final players